Senator Stern may refer to:

Grace Mary Stern (1925–1998), Illinois State Senate
Henry Stern (California politician) (born 1982), California State Senate
Adolphus Sterne (1801–1852), Texas State Senate